The following is a list of notable people associated with the old Presidency College, Calcutta.

Most Notable
Swami Vivekananda, the great Nationalist Indian Hindu monk, a chief disciple of the 19th-century Indian teacher Ramakrishna, key figure in the introduction of the Indian philosophies of Vedanta and Yoga to the Western world and is credited with raising interfaith awareness, bringing Hinduism to the status of a major world religion during the late 19th century and founded the Ramakrishna Math and the Ramakrishna Mission.
Subhas Chandra Bose, Freedom Fighter, Commander of INA, First Leader of Free Indian Territory, Mayor of Calcutta; 53rd President of the Indian National Congress; founder of the Forward Bloc ;

Social reform
 Durga Mohan Das, leder of the Brahmo Samaj
 Mahendranath Gupta, author of Sri Sri Ramakrishna Kathamrita (The Gospel of Sri Ramakrishna)

Politics

Presidents
 Dr. Rajendra Prasad, 1st President of India (1950–62)
 Abu Sayeed Chowdhury, 2nd President of Bangladesh (1972–73)
 Abu Sadat Mohammad Sayem, 6th President of Bangladesh (1975–77)
 Fazlul Qadir Chaudhry, (1919–1973) was also the Acting President of Pakistan from time to time when Ayub Khan left the country
Justice Muhammad Habibur Rahman, Chief Adviser to the Government of Bangladesh, 1996 and Chief Justice of Bangladesh

Governors
 Chandeshwar Prasad Narayan Singh, former Governor of Uttar Pradesh
 Lord Satyendra Prasanno Sinha, first Indian Governor of Bihar and Odisha (1920–21)

Prime Ministers
 Mohammad Ali Bogra, 3rd Prime Minister of Pakistan (1953–55)
 A.K. Fazlul Huq, Prime Minister of Bengal (1939–43)

Chief Ministers and Deputy Chief Ministers
 Bidhan Chandra Roy, 2nd Chief Minister of West Bengal (1948–1962); 5th Mayor of Kolkata (1931–1933)
 Siddhartha Shankar Ray, 5th Chief Minister of West Bengal (1972–77); Education Minister, Government of India; Governor of Punjab; Ambassador to U.S.A.
 Jyoti Basu, 6th Chief Minister of West Bengal (1977-2000)
 Buddhadeb Bhattacharya, 7th Chief Minister of West Bengal (2000–11)
 Bishnu Ram Medhi, Chief Minister of Assam (1950–57)
 Anugrah Narayan Sinha, 1st Deputy Chief Minister of Bihar (1946–57)

Ministers
 MJ Akbar, Minister of State for External Affairs, Government of India (2016–2018)
 Bratya Basu, Playwright and actor; Higher Education Minister, Government of West Bengal
 Surendranath Banerjea, Minister in Bengal in the 1920s; 11th President of the Indian National Congress
 Bhupendra Nath Bose, Bar-at-Law, Under Secretary in the Council for the Secretary of State for India;Vice Chancellor, University of Calcutta, and President, Indian National Congress.
 Sarat Chandra Bose, Bengal Congress President; Works, Mines and Power Member, Government of India (1946) and first central cabinet Minister (1947)
 Somnath Chatterjee, Speaker of Lok Sabha, India (2004–2009)
 Sachindra Chaudhuri, Finance Minister of India, 1965-1967
 Pratap Chandra Chunder, Education and Social Welfare Minister, Government of India (1977–1980)
 Chittaranjan Das, known as "Deshbandhu", founder of Swaraj Party
 Asim Dasgupta, Finance Minister, Government of West Bengal (1987–2011)
 B.K. Handique, Union Minister of Mines & Development of North Eastern Region, GOI.
 Azizul Haque, B.L, C.I.E, K.C.S.I, D.Litt., former Education Minister, Government of Bengal
 Humayun Kabir, Education Minister, Government of India (1958–67)
 Fazlul Karim, Mayor of Cox's Bazar
 Abdus Salam Khan, Minister of Public Works and Communication (1955–1956) in the East Pakistan provincial cabinet
 Amit Mitra, Finance Minister of West Bengal (2011–present)
 Syama Prasad Mukherjee, founder of Bharatiya Jana Sangh; Industry and Supply Member, Government of India (1946–50)
 Debi Prasad Pal, Minister of State for Finance, Government of India (1991–96)
 Abdur Rahim, Member of the Bengal Executive Council (Administration of Justice, Jail and other Allied Subjects) (1921–25); later President of the Central Legislative Assembly
 Saugata Roy, Minister of State for Urban Development, Government of India (2009–12)
 Ashoke Kumar Sen, Law and Justice Minister, Government of India (1984–89)
 Jatindra Mohan Sengupta, former Mayor of Calcutta; President of Indian National Congress
 Atish Chandra Sinha, Minister of State for Public Undertaking, Cottage and Small Scale Industries, Government of West Bengal (1972–77) & Zamindar of Kandi, Bengal

Members of Parliament and Legislative Assembly
 Nawaab Syed Shamsul Huda K.C.I.E. (1884), first Indian Muslim President of the reformed legislative council of undivided Bengal in 1921
 Pandit Yamuna Karjee, Member of the Bihar and Orissa Legislative Assembly (1937–42)
 Maharajadhiraja Sir Uday Chand Mahtab, Member of the Bengal Legislative Assembly (1937–52), Member, Indian Constituent Assembly, 1946-47 &  Maharajadhiraja Bahadur of Burdwan.
 Hirendranath Mukherjee, Member of Lok Sabha, leader of the Opposition, India (1952–77)
 Arjun Kumar Sengupta, Member of Rajya Sabha (2006-2010)

Maharajas and Zamindars
 Colonel H.H. Maharaja Nripendra Narayan Bhup Bahadur of Coochbehar
 Maharajaadhiraja Uday Chand Mahtab of Burdwan
 Zamindar Ali Akthar Khan of Monraj. Secretary to Nawab Ali Haider Khan. First person from Moulvibazar District to graduate from Presidency College.

Members of Political Parties
 Anandamohan Bose, One of the earliest Indian political leaders during the British Raj.
Ashim Chatterjee, former Naxalite leader
 Ullaskar Dutta, former member of Jugantar Party; freedom fighter, long-tortured inmate of Andaman cellular jail
 Atulkrishna Ghosh, member of the Anushilan Samiti
 Nolini Kanta Gupta, participated in the Alipore Bomb case; writer, Sree Aurobindo Ashram leader
Santosh Rana, leader of Provisional Central Committee, Communist Party of India (Marxist–Leninist)
 Mohit Sen, founder of the United Communist Party of India; member of the Communist Party of India

Judiciary
 Syed Ameer Ali, first Indian Law Lord of the Privy Council.
 Amin Ahmed, Chief Justice of the High Court of Dacca.
 Justice Gooroodas Banerjee, former Judge of the High Court of Calcutta.
 Justice Indira Banerjee, Judge, Supreme Court of India. 
 Pramada Charan Banerjee, Judge of the High Court of Allahabad.
 Monomohun Ghose, first practising Indian barrister of the Calcutta High Court.
 Sir Sarat Kumar Ghosh, I.C.S, Chief Justice of Jaipur and Kashmir.
 Justice Sambhu Chandra Ghose Chief Justice of the Calcutta High Court
 Kulada Charan Das Gupta, I.C.S, Chief Justice of Calcutta High Court
 Sadhan Chandra Gupta, former Advocate General of West Bengal.
 Justice Altamas Kabir, 39th Chief Justice (retd.) of the Supreme Court of India.
 Sir Ashutosh Mookerjee, former Chief Justice (acting) of the Calcutta High Court; five times Vice Chancellor of the University of Calcutta
 Justice Chittatosh Mookerjee, Chief Justice of the High Courts of Bombay and Calcutta
 Justice Sabyasachi Mukherjee, former Chief Justice of India
 Justice Radhabinod Pal Judge of the High Court of Calcutta; Vice-Chancellor, University of Calcutta
 Sudhamoy Pramanick, advocate; Indian independence activist; lifetime secretary of the Tili Samaj
 Brajkishore Prasad, lawyer; Zamindar of Shrinagar in Bihar
 Justice Ajit Nath Ray, Chief Justice (retired) of the Supreme Court of India
 Justice Subimal Chandra Roy, Judge (retired), Supreme Court of India
 Sudhansu Kumar Das, I.C.S and Acting Chief Justice of the Supreme Court of India
 Alak Chandra Gupta, Justice of the Supreme court 
 Satyendra Prasanna Sinha, 1st Baron Sinha, Only Indian to be elevated to the house of lords, eminent barrister at the Calcutta High court

Administration
 Khan Bahadur Ahsanullah, IES, ADPI for Mohammedan Education, Bengal
 Anandaram Baruah, ICS, District Magistrate in Bengal
 Alapan Bandyopadhyay, former Chief Secretary to the Government of West Bengal and 1st Chief Adviser to the Government of West Bengal
 Atul Chandra Chatterjee, ICS, former Indian High Commissioner to the United Kingdom
 Gurusaday Dutt, ICS, Secretary, Local Self Government and Public Health Secretary, Government of Bengal
 Behari Lal Gupta, ICS, former Dewan of Baroda
 Sukumar Sen, ICS, Chief Election Commissioner of India
 Ranadhir Chandra Sarma Sarkar, IAS, Law Secretary, GOI, Chairman, UPSC
 Nitish Sengupta, IAS, Secretary, Department of Revenue, GOI
 Arjun Kumar Sengupta, Member-Secretary of Planning Commission; Chairman, National Commission on Enterprises in the Unorganised Sector (NCEUS)
 Jawhar Sircar, Secretary, Ministry of Culture, GOI
 Himachal Som, IFS, Indian Ambassador to Italy
 Satyendranath Tagore, ICS, District and Sessions Judge in Gujarat
 Soumen Mitra, IPS, Police Commissioner of Kolkata

Armed forces
Air Marshal Subroto Mukerjee, first Indian Chief of the Air Staff of the Indian Air Force
Admiral Adhar Kumar Chatterji, first Indian officer to hold the rank of full Admiral in the Indian Navy

Industrialists
 Basant Kumar Birla, Chairman of B.K. Birla Group
 Khuda Buksh, pioneer of insurance in Bangladesh
 Ramgopal Ghosh, founder of R.G. Ghosh and Co.
 Rama Prasad Goenka, Chairman Emeritus of RPG Group
 Fanindra Nath Gooptu, Founder of F.N. Gooptu & Sons
 Sir Rajendra Nath Mookerjee, founder of Indian Iron and Steel Company at Burnpur; architect of the Victoria Memorial in Kolkata
 Bipradas Pal Chowdhury, founder of Gayabari Tea Estate
 Prafulla Chandra Roy, founder of Bengal Chemicals & Pharmaceuticals

Medicine
Bidhan Chandra Ray, eminent doctor and 2nd Chief Minister of West Bengal
Girindrashekhar Bose, eminent psychoanalyst and first President of Indian Psychoanalytical Society

Academics

Languages

Bengali
 Muhammad Shahidullah, writer and linguist
 Arun Mukhopadhyay Author

English
 Subodh Chandra Sengupta, former Principal of College and English literary scholar; awarded Padma Bhushan 3rd highest civilian honor of the Government of India
 Ahmad Ali, British Council Visiting Professor of English, the National Central University, Nanking
 Jasodhara Bagchi, former Chairperson, West Bengal Women's Commission, Calcutta
 Swapan Kumar Chakravorty, former Director-General, National Library, Kolkata
 Sukanta Chaudhuri, Emeritus Professor of English, Jadavpur University, Calcutta
 Supriya Chaudhuri, Professor of English, Jadavpur University, Calcutta
 Malabika Sarkar, former Vice-Chancellor, Presidency University
 Peary Charan Sarkar, former Headmaster, Hare School, Calcutta
 Nabaneeta Dev Sen, former Professor of Comparative Literature, Jadavpur University, Calcutta
 Gayatri Chakravorty Spivak, professor, Department of English and Comparative Literature, Columbia University, USA

Sanskritists
 Bhudev Mukhopadhyay, CIE, former Director of Public Instructions
 Haraprasad Shastri, former Principal of Sanskrit College, Calcutta

Mathematical Sciences

Mathematicians
 Azizul Haque, contributed to the mathematical formula for Henry Classification System of fingerprinting still widely used in the world
 Radhanath Sikdar, first person to calculate the height of Mount Everest

Statisticians
 Anil Kumar Gain, mathematician and statistician from the University of Cambridge; Fellow of the Royal Society
 Prasanta Chandra Mahalanobis, Founder-Director, Indian Statistical Institute, Calcutta
 Samarendra Nath Roy, was a Professor of Statistics at the University of North Carolina at Chapel Hill.
 Sudipto Banerjee, Professor and Chair, Department of Biostatistics at University of California, Los Angeles
Bhramar Mukherjee,  Chair, Department of Biostatistics University of Michigan. Chair Elect, Committee of Presidents of Statistical Societies.

Natural Sciences

Biologists
 Joyoti Basu, cell biologist, N-Bios laureate
 Birendra Bijoy Biswas, Botanist and molecular biologist, Shanti Swarup Bhatnagar laureate 
 Swapan Kumar Datta, Plant molecular biologist and bio-technologist, Vice chancellor (Offg.) of Visva Bharati
 Siddhartha Roy, structural biologist, Shanti Swarup Bhatnagar laureate
 Mahendralal Sarkar, founder, Indian Association for the Cultivation of Sciences, Calcutta

Chemists
 Subhodeep saha, first to synthesise urea stibamine
 Mihir Chowdhury - physical chemist, Shanti Swarup Bhatnagar laureate
 Muhammad Qudrat-i-Khuda - Bangladeshi organic chemist and writer. Founder of BCSIR. Famous for his researches on jute-byproducts. Considered as the National Scientist of Bangladesh. Awardee of Sitara-e-Imtiaz (1972), Ekushey Padak (1976) and Independence Day Award (1984).
 Bidyendu Mohan Deb - chemical physicist, Shanti Swarup Bhatnagar laureate
 Biman Bagchi - theoretical physicist, Shanti Swarup Bhatnagar laureate
 Sumit Bhaduri - organic chemist, Shanti Swarup Bhatnagar laureate
 Tushar Kanti Chakraborty, organic chemist, Shanti Swarup Bhatnagar laureate
Jnan Chandra Ghosh, Director of the IISc Bangalore, the IIT Kharagpur, the Vice Chancellor of Calcutta University, and the Director-general of Industries and Supplies, Government of India.

Computer Scientists
 Sanghamitra Bandyopadhyay, first woman Director of Indian Statistical Institute

Engineers
Fazlur Rahman Khan, structural engineer; designed Chicago's 100-story John Hancock Center and 110-story Sears Tower. Widely known as the Einstein of Structural Architecture.

Geologists
Rakhaldas Bandyopadhyay; Paleographist; archeologist; a household name as one of the discoverers of Mahenjodaro civilization.
Kshitindramohan Naha, geologist and Shanti Swarup Bhatnagar laureate
Subir Kumar Ghosh, geologist and Shanti Swarup Bhatnagar laureate

Physicists
 Meghnad Saha, discovered the Saha ionization equation
 Satyendranath Bose, discovered Bose–Einstein statistics along with Albert Einstein; Bosons; Padma Vibhushan
 Indrani Bose, Emeritus Professor of Physics, Bose Institute, Kolkata
 Chandan Dasgupta, FNA, condensed matter physicist
 Sisir Kumar Mitra, FRS, radio-physicist, namesake of a crater on the moon
 Biswa Ranjan Nag, physicist, Shanti Swarup Bhatnagar laureate
 Amal Kumar Raychaudhuri, physicist, known for Raychaudhuri's equation in general theory of relativity; former Professor and Head of Physics, Presidency College
 Amitava Raychaudhuri, FNA, particle physicist
 Somak Raychaudhury, Eminent astrophysicist, Director of  IUCAA
 Sudhansu Datta Majumdar, Theoretical Physicist, Known for Majumdar–Papapetrou Solution
 Probir Roy, particle physicist, Shanti Swarup Bhatnagar laureate
 Sankar Das Sarma, eminent theoretical condensed matter physicist and Richard E Prange Chaired Professor at University of Maryland, US
 Ashoke Sen, eminent physicist; has contributed to string theory, winner of the Breakthrough Prize in Fundamental Physics
 Bikash Sinha, Padma Bhushan, Director (retd.), Saha Institute of Nuclear Physics, Calcutta
 Palash Baran Pal, Particle Physicist, well known for his contributions to Bengali literature, receiver of Rabindra Smriti Puroshkar
 Chanchal Majumdar, Indian condensed matter physicist, Founder director of S.N. Bose National Centre for Basic Sciences.
Pradip Narayan Ghosh Indian laser physicist, former Vice Chancellor of Jadavpur University, Calcutta.

Psychologists
P. K. Roy, first Indian Principal of Presidency College, Calcutta

Social Sciences

Anthropologists
Surajit Chandra Sinha, former Vice Chancellor, Visva-Bharati, Santiniketan; Maharajkumar of Susanga, Bengal
Nirmal Kumar Bose; he was also a leading sociologist, urbanist, Gandhian, and educationist. Also active in the Indian freedom struggle with Mahatma Gandhi;served as Gandhi's private secretary in 1940's. Studied also Honors in Geology.

Economists
 Abhijit Banerjee, professor at Massachusetts Institute of Technology, winner of the Nobel Prize in Economics in 2019
 Amartya Sen, Master, Trinity College, Cambridge (1998–2004); winner of the Nobel Prize in Economics, 1998
 Amitava Bose, former Director, Indian Institute of Management, Calcutta
 Amiya Bagchi, Chancellor, Tripura University, Agartala
 Anindya Sen, Professor of Economics, Indian Institute of Management, Calcutta
 Bibek Debroy, former Director, Rajiv Gandhi Institute for Contemporary Studies, New Delhi
 Bimal Jalan, former Governor of the Reserve Bank of India (2000-4)
 Debraj Ray, Julius Silver Professor of Economics, New York University
Dilip Mookerjee, Professor of Economics, Boston University 
 Isher Judge Ahluwalia, Chairperson, Indian Council for Research on International Economic Relations
 Maitreesh Ghatak, Professor of Economics, London School of Economics
 Mihir Rakshit, Professor, Indian Statistical Institute, Kolkata
 Pranab Bardhan, Professor at University of California at Berkeley
 Radhakamal Mukerjee, former Vice-Chancellor of University of Lucknow
 Ratan Lal Basu, Fiction writer in English & Bengali, Indologist and author of books on ancient Indian Economics
 Sugata Marjit, former Director, Centre for Studies in Social Sciences, Calcutta (2007–2012), Vice-Chancellor, University of Calcutta; author.
 Sukhamoy Chakravarty, Professor of Economics, Delhi School of Economics, Delhi; was a key architect of the Five-Year plans of India; Chakravarty Committee on Monetary Policy (1985)

Historians
 A.F. Salahuddin Ahmed, Professor (retd) of History, Dhaka University; awarded the Ekushe Padak by the Government of Bangladesh
 Rakhaldas Bandyopadhyay, discoverer of Mohenjodaro, the principal site of the Harappa Culture
Gautam Bhadra, Professor (retd.) of History, Centre for Studies in Social Sciences, Calcutta
Sugata Bose, Gardiner Professor of Oceanic History and Affairs, Harvard University, US
 Dipesh Chakrabarty, Lawrence A. Kimpton Professor of South Asian History, University of Chicago
 Barun De, Former Chairman, West Bengal Heritage Commission and Founder-Director, Centre for Studies in Social Sciences, Calcutta.
Ranajit Guha, Reader (retd.) in History, University of Sussex
 Dwijendra Narayan Jha, Professor (retd) of History, University of Delhi
 Romesh Chandra Majumdar, Former Vice Chancellor, University of Dacca
 Rajat Kanta Ray, Vice Chancellor (retd), Visva-Bharati University, Santiniketan
 Hemchandra Raychaudhuri, Charmichael Professor (retd.) of Ancient Indian History and Culture, University of Calcutta
 Tapan Raychaudhuri, Padma Bhushan, Ad Hominem Professor (retd) of Indian History and Civilization, University of Oxford
 Jadunath Sarkar, Kt.,Vice Chancellor (retd), University of Calcutta
Tanika Sarkar, Professor at Jawaharlal Nehru University 
 Sumit Sarkar, Professor (retd) of History, University of Delhi
 Susobhan Chandra Sarkar, Professor (retd) of History, Presidency College, Calcutta

Political Scientists
 Sonali Chakravarti Banerjee, Vice Chancellor, University of Calcutta
 Partha Chatterjee, Professor of Anthropology, Columbia University, New York, US
 Sudipta Kaviraj, Professor and Chair of the Department of Political Science, Columbia University, New York

Journalists
Anjan Banerjee, Editor, Zee 24 Ghanta
 Krishna Mohan Banerjee, publisher of Inquirer
 Pramatha Chaudhuri, former editor of Sabuj Patra
Ashok Malik, Press Secretary to the President Of India
 Rasik Krishna Mallick, former editor, Jnananwesan
 Rudrangshu Mukherjee, Opinions Editor, The Telegraph
 Udayan Mukherjee, Managing Editor, CNBC India
 Pritish Nandy, former editor, Illustrated Weekly of India
 Akshay Chandra Sarkar, former editor, Sadharani

Poets, novelists and Non-Fiction Writers
 Rabindranath Tagore, winner of the Nobel Prize in Literature in 1913
 Manik Bandopadhyay, novelist
 Rajnarayan Basu, writer and Brahmo Samaj pioneer; maternal grandfather of Sri Aurobindo
 Rajsekhar Basu, studied chemistry; novelist, published using the nom-de-plume Parasuram
 Samit Basu, novelist
 Sasthi Brata, writer
 Bankim Chandra Chatterjee, poet and novelist
 Sanjib Chandra Chattopadhyay, writer, brother of Bankim Chandra
 Shakti Chattopadhyay, poet
 Jibanananda Das, poet
 Henry Louis Vivan Derozio, poet
 Michael Madhusudan Dutt, poet
 Shankha Ghosh, poet
 Shahidullah Kaiser, winner of Bangla Academy Award
 Peary Chand Mitra, novelist; author of the first Bengali novel, 
 Acharya Kuber Nath Rai, writer of Hindi literature
 Dwijendralal Ray, poet, playwright and musician
 Sukumar Ray, poet and humourist, printing technologist
 Upendrakishore Ray Chowdhury, writer
 Bhabendra Nath Saikia, novelist
 Jyotirindranath Tagore, poet and novelist
 Alokeranjan Dasgupta Bengali poet; Goethe Award from
 Palash Baran Pal, studied Physics; writer, poet and linguist. Winner of Rabindra Smriti Puroshkar
 Ramapada Chowdhury, Indian novelist and short story writer.
Anuradha Roy, Indian novelist, journalist and editor
Devapriya Roy, Indian novelist.

Artists and Musicians
 Pritam Chakraborty, Bollywood music director; sound engineer
 Devajyoti Ray, artist
 Dilipkumar Roy, singer
 Atulprasad Sen, composer & singer of devotional and love songs of his own genre

Filmmakers, Theatre Personalities and Actors
 Pramathesh Barua, actor and director
 Suman Ghosh, Filmmaker
 Chhabi Biswas, actor
 Bikash Roy, Actor
 Ashok Kumar, winner of the Dadasaheb Phalke Award (1988)
 Dinabandhu Mitra, author of Nildarpan
 Srijit Mukherji, filmmaker
 Satyajit Ray, eminent Indian film director; Winner of the Academy Honorary Award in 1992 for lifetime achievement
 Aparna Sen, actress
 Subrata Sen, filmmaker, author
 Dhritiman Chatterjee, actor
 Ritwik Ghatak, filmmaker

Sportspersons
 Vece Paes, member of the bronze medal-winning Indian hockey team at the Munich Olympics (1972)

Faculty Members
 Syed Ameer Ali, former Judge of the High Court of Calcutta
 Bhabatarak Bhattacharyya, structural biologist
 Charu Chandra Bhattacharya, physicist
 Katyayanidas Bhattacharya, philosopher and former professor, Department of Philosophy, Presidency College, Calcutta
 Acharya Jagadish Chandra Bose, scientist
Kanny Lall Dey, Professor of Chemistry 
 Prafulla Chandra Ghosh chemist and politician
 Rabindra Kumar Das Gupta, former Director, National Library, Calcutta
 Bhabatosh Datta, Finance Secretary, Government of West Bengal
 Bishnu Dey, poet
 Anil Kumar Gain, mathematician and statistician
Amal Kumar Raychaudhuri, physicist and head of the physics department at presidency college 
 M.S. Krishnan, Director General of the Geological Survey of India.
 David Lester Richardson, former Principal of Hindu College, Calcutta
 Acharya Prafulla Chandra Roy, chemist
 Dipak Banerjee, former Head of the Department of Economics of Presidency College, Kolkata
William Trego Webb, author and teacher

References

Presidency University, Kolkata alumni
Academic staff of Presidency University, Kolkata
Kolkata Presidencians
Presidency University, Kolkata
University of Calcutta alumni
Kolkata-related lists